Doke Schmidt (born 7 April 1992) is a Dutch professional footballer who plays as a right-back for Cambuur in the Eredivisie. He formerly played one season on loan for Go Ahead Eagles.

References

External links
 
 Voetbal International profile 
 

1992 births
Living people
Sportspeople from Heerenveen
Dutch footballers
Association football defenders
Eredivisie players
Eerste Divisie players
SC Heerenveen players
Go Ahead Eagles players
SC Cambuur players
Netherlands youth international footballers
Footballers from Friesland
Dutch people of German descent